Jaime Sciarappa is a Boston area bass player best known for his work with 1980s hardcore punk bands SSD and Slapshot.

References

Year of birth missing (living people)
Living people
People from Greater Boston
American bass guitarists
Guitarists from Massachusetts
American male bass guitarists